Vladimir Ionuț Screciu (born 13 January 2000) is a Romanian professional footballer who plays mainly as a midfielder for Liga I club CS Universitatea Craiova.

Club career

Early career / Universitatea Craiova
Born in Corabia, Olt County, Screciu began his career with local CSȘ Corabia in 2010. The following year he joined the youth setup of FC Universitatea Craiova, and in 2013 moved to CS Universitatea Craiova. On 2 October 2016, 16-year-old Screciu was handed his Liga I debut by head coach Gheorghe Mulțescu, entering in the 82nd minute of a 1–2 away loss to FC Steaua București.

In April 2017, Portuguese newspaper O Jogo reported that Benfica showed interest in signing the player. He was an unused substitute in the 2018 Cupa României Final on 27 May, as the Alb-albaștrii won 2–0 over Hermannstadt. During his first spell at the club, Screciu amassed 44 appearances in all competitions.

Genk
On 19 June 2018, Genk announced the signing of Screciu on a three-year contract with the option of another year. The Belgian team paid a rumoured fee of €2 million plus bonuses for the transfer.

Return to Universitatea Craiova
Screciu dealt with injuries during his spell in Belgium, and returned to Universitatea Craiova in 2021.

Style of play

Screciu plays primarily as a central or a defensive midfielder, but can also operate as a central defender.

Career statistics

Club

Honours
Universitatea Craiova
Cupa României: 2017–18, 2020–21
Supercupa României: 2021

Genk
 Belgian First Division A: 2018–19

References

External links

2000 births
Living people
People from Corabia
Romanian footballers
Association football midfielders
Association football defenders
Liga I players
CS Universitatea Craiova players
K.R.C. Genk players
Lommel S.K. players
Belgian Pro League players
Challenger Pro League players
Romania youth international footballers
Romania under-21 international footballers
Romanian expatriate footballers
Expatriate footballers in Belgium
Romanian expatriate sportspeople in Belgium